Morsea islandica, the island monkey grasshopper, is a species of monkey grasshopper in the family Eumastacidae. It is found in North America.

References

Further reading

 
 
 

Eumastacidae
Insects described in 1981